Cristóbal Fernández Valtodano (died 14 November 1572) was a Roman Catholic prelate who served as Archbishop of Santiago de Compostela (1570–1572) and Bishop of Palencia (1561–1570).

Biography
On 2 June 1561, Cristóbal Fernández Valtodano was appointed during the papacy of Pope Pius IV as Bishop of Palencia.
On 20 February 1570, he was appointed during the papacy of Pope Pius V as Archbishop of Santiago de Compostela. 
He served as Archbishop of Santiago de Compostela until his death on 14 November 1572.

References

External links and additional sources
 (for Chronology of Bishops) 
 (for Chronology of Bishops) 
 (for Chronology of Bishops) 
 (for Chronology of Bishops) 

16th-century Roman Catholic archbishops in Spain
1572 deaths
Bishops appointed by Pope Pius IV
Bishops appointed by Pope Pius V